Vladimir Lukarić (born 22 January 1939) is a former Croatian football player and manager. He has had six appearances for the Yugoslav national team, scoring his only goal against Ethiopia in 1962.

Playing career

Club
Born in Rijeka (back then still named Fiume and part of the Kingdom of Italy) as a player, he was HNK Rijeka's first player to be capped for the Yugoslav national team in 1961.  He spent much of his career in Rijeka, collecting over 200 league caps and scoring 42 goals.  He also had a two-year spell with AC Bellinzona in Switzerland before returning to HNK Rijeka as assistant manager.

International
Lukarić made his first international appearance for Yugoslavia national team in 1961 in a friendly match against Morocco and earned a total of 6 caps, scoring 1 goal. His final international was a September 1965 friendly away against the Soviet Union.

International appearances

International goals

Career statistics

Player statistics

Managerial career
As a manager, Lukarić was a coach of all youth levels of Rijeka before becoming their main coach between 1989 and 1991.  He also coached other local clubs such as NK Buje, NK Crikvenica and NK Pomorac Kostrena.  He was also the assistant manager of the Croatian national team in 1990 in their match against the United States.

Managerial statistics

 *Dates of first and last games under Lukarić; not dates of official appointments

Honours

Player
HNK Rijeka
Yugoslav Second League: 1971-72

Individual
HNK Rijeka all time XI by Novi list

Manager
HNK Rijeka (Youth)
SR Croatia Youth Cup: 1982
Yugoslav Youth Cup: 1982
Croatian Youth Cup: 1992

References

External links
Izmk
Nogometni leksikon

1939 births
Living people
Footballers from Rijeka
Association football forwards
Yugoslav footballers
Yugoslavia international footballers
HNK Rijeka players
AC Bellinzona players
Yugoslav First League players
Swiss Super League players
Yugoslav expatriate footballers
Expatriate footballers in Switzerland
Yugoslav expatriate sportspeople in Switzerland
Yugoslav football managers
Croatian football managers
HNK Rijeka managers
HNK Rijeka non-playing staff